Kęstutis Ruzgys (born 15 September 1962) is a retired Lithuanian football forward who played in Soviet Union, Baltic states, Yugoslavia and Germany during his professional career.

Ruzgys was born in Klaipėda.  He played with FK Žalgiris Vilnius in the Soviet First League in addition to OFK Beograd in the Yugoslav First League. He won a total of three caps for the Lithuanian national team, scoring no goals, while playing in Serbia as a professional for OFK Beograd.  He ended his career playing in Germany with Sportfreunde Siegen.

His son, Manfredas Ruzgys, born in 1997, is also a footballer, and debuted for Lithuania in 2016 at age of 19.

Honours
Granitas Klaipėda
Lithuanian Championship: 1984
Lithuanian Cup: 1983 and 1986
Sirijus Klaipėda
Lithuanian Championship: 1990
Lithuanian Cup: 1990
National Team
 Baltic Cup: 1992

References

External links 
 

1962 births
Living people
Sportspeople from Klaipėda
Lithuanian footballers
Lithuania international footballers
Lithuanian expatriate footballers
Association football forwards
Soviet Top League players
FK Atlantas players
FK Žalgiris players
FK Sirijus Klaipėda players
Daugava Rīga players
Expatriate footballers in Latvia
OFK Beograd players
Expatriate footballers in Yugoslavia
Sportfreunde Siegen players
Expatriate footballers in Germany